Angophora exul, commonly known as the Gibraltar rock apple,  is an endangered tree native to a small area in eastern Australia.

Angophora exul is now accepted as a synonym of A. bakeri subsp. exul by the Australian Plant Census.

References

exul
Flora of New South Wales
Trees of Australia